Ormeaux may refer to:

People
 Adam Dollard des Ormeaux, colonist and soldier of New France

Places
Canada
 Dollard-Des Ormeaux–Roxboro, former borough in the West Island area of Montreal, Quebec
 Dollard-des-Ormeaux, town on the Island of Montreal, Quebec
France
 Chaillé-sous-les-Ormeaux, village and commune of the Vendée département
 Lumigny-Nesles-Ormeaux, commune in the Seine-et-Marne département
 Saint-Aubin-des-Ormeaux, village and commune of the Vendée département
 Savignac-les-Ormeaux, commune in the Ariège department